Chang Chuan-tien (15 August 1945 – 10 September 2006) was a Taiwanese politician.

Early life and education
Chang was born in Taihoku Prefecture of Japanese Taiwan, in what is now Jiaoxi, Yilan. He earned a bachelor's degree in political science from Tunghai University, graduating in 1973.

Political career
He cofounded the Democratic Progressive Party in 1986, and was a member of the Yilan Gang, a DPP clique. Chang served in the National Assembly from 1992 to 1997, and in 1998, was elected to the Legislative Yuan. He represented his hometown Yilan County district until his death in 2006 from liver failure, aged 61.

References

1945 births
2006 deaths
Yilan County Members of the Legislative Yuan
Members of the 4th Legislative Yuan
Members of the 5th Legislative Yuan
Members of the 6th Legislative Yuan
Taiwanese political party founders
Democratic Progressive Party Members of the Legislative Yuan
Tunghai University alumni